Ecitocobius is a monotypic genus of South American corinnid sac spiders containing the single species, Ecitocobius comissator. It was first described by A. B. Bonaldo & Antônio Brescovit in 1998, and has only been found in Brazil.

References

Corinnidae
Monotypic Araneomorphae genera
Spiders of Brazil
Taxa named by Antônio Brescovit